The 1911 Italian Athletics Championships  were held in Rome. it was the 6th edition of the Italian Athletics Championships.

Champions

References

External links 
 Italian Athletics Federation

Italian Athletics Championships
Italian Athletics Outdoor Championships
1911 in Italian sport